Glay is a Japanese rock band.

Glay may also refer to:

 Glay (album), a 2010 album by Glay
 Glay, Doubs, a commune in France
 Marcel Le Glay (1920–1992), French historian and archaeologist
 Maurice Le Glay (1868–1936), French Army officer and author
 George Albert Glay, author of the 1955 novel Oath Of Seven, an Ace single volume
 Glay, a fictional character in the 1973 novel Trullion: Alastor 2262 by Jack Vance
 Glay Field, an athletic field at Providence College in Rhode Island, United States